WHGT (1590 AM) is a religious formatted broadcast radio station licensed to Maugansville, Maryland, serving the Chambersburg/Hagerstown area. WHGT is owned and operated by Emmanuel Baptist Temple in Hagerstown, Maryland.

History
VerStandig Broadcasting, former owner of AM 1590, "donated" the station to Emmanuel Baptist Temple after a very public battle of the station's tower, which was in Chambersburg city limits. On January 1, WCBG switched calls with then sister WHGT and moved all programming to AM 1380 and AM 1590 fell silent. AM 1590 would remain silent until December 4, 2005, with FBN religious programming and operated by Emmanuel Baptist Temple. Upon acquiring land, WHGT moved its city of license to Maugansville, MD, several miles south of Chambersburg. As of August 2010, the two radio towers broadcast with a directional signal at 15,000 watts of power during the day, covering others cities such as Hagerstown, MD and Martinsburg, WV. Under ideal conditions, the signal goes as far north as northern Pennsylvania; faint remnants of the signal could be heard there when WGGO was silent, and the station's signal still occasionally overwhelms WGGO's during critical hours.

External links
WHGT Christian Radio Online

Christianity in Hagerstown, Maryland
HGT
Radio stations established in 1956
1956 establishments in Maryland
Washington County, Maryland